Palaun may refer to:
Palauan language
Palaung language